László Pintér (born November 12, 1950) is a Hungarian politician, member of the National Assembly (MP) for Lenti (Zala County Constituency IV) between 2010 and 2014. He served as mayor of his birthplace, Kerkakutas between 1990 and 2006.

He was a candidate for MP as a member of the Independent Smallholders, Agrarian Workers and Civic Party (FKGP) during the 1998 parliamentary election. After the disintegration of the FKGP he joined Fidesz in 2003. He was appointed vice president of the General Assembly of Zala County in 2006. He was a member of the Committee on Foreign Affairs from May 14, 2010 to May 5, 2014.

References

1950 births
Living people
Mayors of places in Hungary
Independent Smallholders, Agrarian Workers and Civic Party politicians
Fidesz politicians
Members of the National Assembly of Hungary (2010–2014)
People from Zala County